Illinois State University (ISU) is a public university in Normal, Illinois.  Founded in 1857 as Illinois State Normal University, it is the oldest public university in Illinois. The university emphasizes teaching and is recognized as one of the top ten largest producers of teachers in the US according to the American Association of Colleges of Teacher Education. It is classified among "R2: Doctoral Universities – High research activity".

The university's athletic teams are members of the Missouri Valley Conference and the Missouri Valley Football Conference and are known as the "Redbirds," in reference to the state bird, the cardinal.

History 
ISU was founded as a training school for teachers in 1857, the same year Illinois' first Board of Education was convened and two years after the Free School Act was passed by the state legislature. Among its supporters were judge and future Supreme Court Justice, David Davis and local businessman and land holder Jesse W. Fell whose friend, Abraham Lincoln, was the attorney hired by the board of education to draw up legal documents to secure the school's funding. Founded as Illinois State Normal University, its name was reflective of its primary mission as a normal school. Classes were initially held in downtown Bloomington, occupying space in Major's Hall, which was previously the site of Lincoln's "Lost Speech." With the completion of Old Main in 1860, the school moved to its current campus in what was then the village of North Bloomington, which was chartered as "Normal" in 1865. The new town had named itself after the university.

On January 1, 1964, the institution's name was changed to Illinois State University at Normal, and then again in 1967 to the current Illinois State University.

In accordance with its mission, the school's motto was originally "and gladly wold he lerne and gladly teche," in the Middle English spelling of Geoffrey Chaucer which has since been updated to modern English in the gender-neutral form "Gladly we Learn and Teach."

Academics and organizations
Founded as a teachers' college, the university now offers a range of programs at the bachelor, master, and doctoral levels. Illinois State is accredited by the Commission on Institutions of Higher Education of the North Central Association of Colleges and Secondary Schools. The teacher preparation programs are accredited by the National Council for Accreditation of Teacher Education and certified by the Illinois State Board of Education. In addition, 22 programs hold discipline-based accreditation.

Academic colleges
 College of Applied Science and Technology
 College of Arts and Sciences
 College of Business
 College of Education
 Wonsook Kim College of Fine Arts
 Mennonite College of Nursing

Rankings

In the 2023 rankings, U.S. News & World Report ranked Illinois State University (tied for) 219 among a combined list of America's best 440 private and public "national universities" and (tied for) 112 among 227 public "national universities" in the United States that qualified for the list.

Forbes magazine ranks Illinois State #259 out of 650 American colleges.

Demographics

As of the fall of 2021, total on-campus enrollment was 20,233, with 17,674 undergraduate students and 2,559 graduate students. As of 2019 56.6 percent of students are female, while 43.4 percent are male. About 28.8% of all students were from minority groups. Of the 558 international students 422 are graduate students. International students come from 69 countries. The average new freshman student had an ACT score near 24 and a gpa of 3.6 out of 4.0.

The Quad

Initially designed by William Saunders, the Illinois State University campus quadrangle (commonly known as The Quad), is a popular outdoor venue for students and the local community. Lined with benches and shady trees, the site is a popular spot for students to relax, study, and play informal games of sports.  Outdoor events such as the annual RSO showcase, Festival ISU and Concerts on the Quad are popular in the campus community.

The ISU Quad is also host to the Fell Arboretum, which is part of a 490-acre site that represents over 154 species of trees from the state of Illinois.  Trees on the north side of the quad are from Northern Illinois, and those on the south side of the quad from southern parts of the state.  The Fell Arboretum is part of the Arbor Day Foundation's Tree Campus Higher Education Institution.

Milner Library

Milner Library has a collection of more than 1.63 million volumes and an ever-increasing number of electronic materials accessible by the Internet to students and faculty. The library's collection is distinguished by materials related to educational theory and policy, curriculum development, and issues related to special education and assistive technology. The Special Collections include extensive Circus and Allied Arts materials and a children's literature collection that features more than 100 first edition volumes signed by author Lois Lenski. Milner Library is also a selective federal depository for government information. Combined Milner's collections contribute to the university's relatively high standing in regional, national, and world rankings. In 2007, the library received the John Cotton Dana Library Public Relations Award, an award given to only seven libraries nationwide.

Milner Library administers the Dr. Jo Ann Rayfield University Archives, which houses selected official records from university departments and organizations, faculty papers, and memorabilia and ephemera on student life. The archives also hosts a branch of the Illinois Regional Archives Depository (IRAD). In addition to making physical collections available for in-person use, the Rayfield Archives has made many of the university's official publications freely available for online research use.

Additional library facilities include book storage both on and off-site as well as a preservation department.

The Milner Library was named for Angeline "Ange" Vernon Milner (1856–1928), a Bloomington-Normal native and the first full-time librarian of Illinois State Normal University. Milner is credited with organizing the university's initial collection of more than 40,000 items and was a prolific author of more than seventy articles and short monographs in library and education journals during her tenure as University Librarian from 1890 to 1927. 

The current library building, opened in 1976, is the second facility constructed to be a dedicated library. The university library has resided in five campus locations: Old Main (demolished 1958), John W. Cook Hall, North Hall (demolished 1965), Williams Hall (first known as Milner Library), and the current Milner Library.

Residence halls
Illinois State University has six residence halls, one apartment complex, and dedicated apartments for upper class and graduate students.  Facilities are administered by the ISU's University Housing Services.

Watterson
Watterson Towers is not only the largest residence hall on campus, it is also one of the world's tallest student residence halls, and provides the highest vantage point in Illinois between Chicago and St. Louis.  Watterson features areas for wellness, quiet, substance-free, and restricted visitation. Built between 1968 and 1970, the facility is named for Arthur W. Watterson, a geography faculty member and chair. Watterson went through a massive renovation from March 2010 through August 2012.

Watterson's twin towers have five "houses" apiece. Each "house" has five floors with each floor divided into four suites. Each of the 10 houses was named after a former United States Secretary of State. In 2020, the houses were renamed due to 8 of the 10 secretaries having had slaves.

East Campus
Hewett and Manchester Hall are in East Campus. Built in 1966, they were named after Edwin C. Hewett, the third University president, and Orson L. Manchester, Illinois State Normal University dean from 1911 to 1928.

Both are for the most part coed, with specialty floors designated as all male or all female. Until recently, Hewett was all-female. Between both Hewett and Manchester, there are floors dedicated to students majoring in art, business, communication, co-sciences, curriculum and instruction, Geo-Environmental, Honors, Information Technology, Math, and Music. Other floors are dedicated to students with interests and preferences such as service and leadership, substance-free, quiet, and international house.

These residence halls were renovated in 2008–09. During this renovation, the dining center in the basement between each hall was transformed into the Julia N. Visor Center which is dedicated to helping students achieve academic success through free tutoring and other services.

West Campus
Haynie, Wilkins, and Wright Hall are in West Campus, next to Redbird Arena and Hancock Stadium. Also known as "The Tri Towers", they feature floors for ROTC, Wellness, Substance-Free, and Quiet. These halls are the most remote residence facilities on campus and are known for housing a majority of athletes because of their proximity to practice areas. They were built in 1962 and named for Martha D.L. Haynie, the first female Illinois State Normal University professor, Daniel Wilkins, principal of the Female School Institute of Bloomington in the 1850s, and Simeon Wright, one of the university's founders.

Cardinal Court
In 2012, the university opened the new Cardinal Court Apartments to replace a complex by the same name and on the same site built in 1959. Much like the old Cardinal Court, the new Cardinal Court provides apartment-style living combined with the benefits of university housing. Besides simply being more modern, the primary difference is that the old Cardinal Court had been reserved for married couples and graduate students.

South Campus
Until recently, there were several residence halls in what has been known as "South Campus". There are no longer any students housed in the area now, and the buildings were demolished in the summer of 2016.

Hamilton and Whitten Hall (aka "Ham-Whit) shared a joint entrance and front desk. They featured lifestyle floors such as Upper-class and Graduate, Student Nursing, and Speech Pathology and Audiology. Constructed in 1959, the facility was named for Alma H. Hamilton, the first recipient of an Illinois State Normal University bachelor's degree, and Jennie Whitten, the former head of the Foreign Language Department.

Atkin and Colby Hall, though built later than "Ham-Whit", were essentially a mirror image of the former, and shared a dining center with the same. Built in 1962 as female-only dorms, they were converted to co-ed. They were named for Edith Irene Atkin, Illinois State Normal University mathematics professor from 1909 to 1940 and June Rose Colby, English professor from 1892 to 1932.

Central Campus
Three residence halls, Dunn, Barton, and Walker Hall, were demolished in 2008 to provide space for the Student Fitness, Kinesiology and Recreation Center.

Student life
The school newspaper, The Vidette first published in 1888 as a subscription-based newspaper serving both the university and Town of Normal. In 1915, the paper received funding from the university and dropped its subscription model. In 2021, The Vidette ceased printing newspapers and became an entirely online news source.

ISU owns a public radio station WGLT ("News, Blues and All That Jazz"), which broadcasts on 89.1 in Normal, 103.5 in Peoria, and by streaming audio. The call letters are from keywords of the school's motto: "Gladly-Learn-Teach." The university also maintains a student radio station, WZND. On January 20, 2010, WZND changed its format from a dual format (Rock and Jamz) to a college shuffle format. The station broadcasts on 103.3 FM, channels 4 & 5 in the residence halls and on the web. TV-10, a part of the School of Communication, provides the only live local television newscast produced entirely in Bloomington-Normal.

ISU has over 400 registered student organizations (RSO) and several university groups that sponsor student-focused events.  The Multicultural Center is home to student diversity advocacy organizations such as the Asian Pacific American Coalition (APAC), the Association of Latin American Students (ALAS), Black Student Union (BSU), and Pride.

Student organizations
Illinois State is home to over 400 registered student organizations or "RSOs". These organizations can range from intramural sports to branches of nationally recognized student organizations. Every year RSOs are able to advertise themselves to students during Festival ISU where RSOs can reserve a booth on the quad where they can meet passing students looking to join an organization.

Illinois State University also boasts one of the largest student spirit organizations in the United States, RED ALERT. This registered student organization has over 4,100 members, roughly one fourth of the student body. The group was founded in 2006 to promote student involvement in university athletics and has grown exponentially.

ISU is also the home of the Gamma Phi Circus, the oldest collegiate circus in the world, founded in 1929. It is one of two collegiate circuses in the US; the other is run by Florida State University.

The Student Government Association at Illinois State University is a unique governing body for the ISU Student Body. It is unique in that it sends 21 voting student members to serve on the Academic Senate which is composed of student, faculty, staff, and administrators. This place in the shared governance of the university is rare among universities giving ISU Students a major voice on campus.

Greek life
The Illinois State University Greek community was established in 1967. Currently about 14% of the student population are active members of Greek Life. Greek organizations provide students with a wide range of academic, social, and leadership opportunities. In the 2015–2016 academic year fraternity and sorority members collectively raised $175,054 for charities and volunteered 44,864 hours of community service. Fraternity and Sorority members had an average GPA of 3.02 in 2016.

Fraternities

Social: Acacia (fraternity), Alpha Sigma Phi, FarmHouse, Phi Kappa Psi, Pi Kappa Phi, Phi Gamma Delta, Sigma Nu, Kappa Sigma, Phi Mu Alpha, Alpha Epsilon Pi, Alpha Tau Omega, Lambda Chi Alpha, Phi Rho Eta, Sigma Alpha Mu, Sigma Chi, Sigma Pi

Social/Cultural: Kappa Alpha Psi, Alpha Phi Alpha, Alpha Psi Lambda, Iota Phi Theta, Sigma Lambda Beta, Omega Psi Phi, Phi Beta Sigma, Lambda Theta Phi

Professional/Music: Delta Omicron, Pi Sigma Epsilon, Alpha Kappa Psi, Delta Sigma Pi, Gamma Iota Sigma, Phi Beta Lambda, Phi Sigma Pi, Phi Gamma Nu

Service: Alpha Phi Omega, Omega Delta Sigma

Sororities

Social: Alpha Gamma Delta, Alpha Omicron Pi, Alpha Delta Pi, Sigma Sigma Sigma, Gamma Phi Beta, Phi Sigma Sigma, Chi Omega, Delta Delta Delta, Delta Zeta, Zeta Tau Alpha, Sigma Alpha, Kappa Kappa Gamma, Zeta Theta Pi

Social/Cultural: Delta Phi Lambda, Delta Sigma Theta, Zeta Phi Beta, Sigma Gamma Rho, Gamma Phi Omega, Omega Phi Beta, Sigma Lambda Gamma

Service: Epsilon Sigma Alpha

Music: Tau Beta Sigma, Sigma Alpha Iota, Delta Omicron

Nationally ranked teams
The ISU Forensics Individual Events team is one of the most successful forensics individual events teams in the country. In 1995, 1999, and 2000 it won the National Forensic Association team championship and in 2005 its team won the American Forensic Association team championship.  Illinois State has been selected as the host of the 2011 NFA National Championship.  Famous alumni include Nelsan Ellis of HBO's True Blood.

In recent years the Illinois State football team has been consistently ranked at the NCAA Division I FCS level.

The Illinois state co-ed cheerleading team has competed at both NCA and UCA nationals in co-ed Division 1. In 2002 they placed 2nd in the nation in co-ed Division 1 at UCA nationals in Orlando, FL. In 2001 they placed 3rd in the nation in co-ed division 1 at UCA nationals in Orlando, FL. They have appeared on ESPN and in American Cheerleader Magazine.

The Illinois State Club Baseball team was ranked No. 18 in the country in the spring of 2010 for much of the year, but ultimately finished second in the Great Lakes South Conference behind the University of Illinois. The Redbirds compiled a 15–5 overall record, including 9–4 in conference.

The Illinois State University Mock Trial Team has enjoyed continue success since its inception in 1987. The team competes in intercollegiate tournaments sponsored by AMTA (American Mock Trial Association). In 2004, they won the National Championship after defeating Gonzaga University in the final round. The team is consistently ranked as a top 5 team in the Midwest.

The ISU Solar Car Team was founded in 2005 and has earned two 2nd place (2011, 2013) a 3rd place (2015) a 4th place (2012) and a 5th place (2009) finish in the Formula Sun Grand Prix.

Athletics

The school's fight song is "Go, You Redbirds," a song written specifically for ISU and frequently played at sporting events. The Alma Mater song, also played at sporting events from time to time, is "Glory Hast Thou," written to the tune of Haydn's "Gott erhalte Franz den Kaiser," and better known as the tune used for "Deutschlandlied," the German national anthem. The Grossinger Motors Arena located in downtown Bloomington is home to the universities 3 club ice hockey teams which compete in ACHA Divisions 1, 2, and 3. The Ice Hockey club is also the oldest registered student organization on campus.

Folklore and legends
The ghost of Angeline Vernon Milner, the university's first librarian, is said to haunt the former library building, now called Williams Hall. Built in 1940, the building was named in honor of Milner who served as University Librarian from 1890 until her retirement in 1927. Beginning in the 1990s, personnel working in the book storage and archives facilities formerly housed in Williams Hall reported encounters with what they believe to be the ghost of Milner.

Points of interest

 Fell Arboretum
 Constitution Trail
 Bowling and Billiard Center
 Redbird Arena
 Bone Student Center
 Braden Auditorium
 Center for the Performing Arts
 Ewing Cultural Center
 Normal Public Library
 Milner Library
 Illinois State University Planetarium
 Student Fitness and Kinesiology Recreation Building
 State Farm Hall of Business
 University Galleries
Intercollegiate Biomathematics Alliance: Research Center
 John W. Cook Hall
 Hancock Stadium
 Weibring Golf Club

Laboratory schools
The university has two laboratory schools: University High School and Thomas Metcalf Laboratory School.

Bloomington/Normal Japanese Saturday School (ブルーミントン・ノーマル補習授業校 Burūminton Nōmaru Hoshū Jugyō Kō), a Japanese weekend school, was established in 1986 and held at the Thomas Metcalf School. It has a separate office in Normal

Notable alumni and faculty

The Illinois State University Alumni Center, located at 1101 N. Main in Normal, is designed to serve over 215,000 alumni of Illinois State University, as well as current students, faculty/staff, and the Bloomington/Normal community.

University presidents

 Charles E. Hovey (1857–1862)
 Richard Edwards (1862–1876)
 Edwin C. Hewett (1876–1890)
 John Williston Cook (1890–1899)
 Arnold Tompkins (1899–1900)
 David Felmley (1900–1930)
 Harry A. Brown (1930–1933)
 Raymond W. Fairchild (1933–1955)
 Robert Gehlmann Bone (1956–1967)
 Samuel Braden (1967–1970)
 David K. Berlo (1971–1973)
 Gene A. Budig (1973–1977)
 Lloyd Watkins (1977–1988)
 Thomas Wallace (1988–1995)
 David A. Strand (1995–1999)
 Victor Boschini Jr. (1999–2003)
 C. Alvin Bowman (2004–2013)
 Timothy Flanagan (2013–2014)
 Larry Dietz (2014–2021)
 Terri Goss Kinzy (2021–2023)

Gallery

References

Further reading
 Anderson, April Karlene. Illinois State University. Charleston, South Carolina: Arcadia Publishing, 2017. 
 Freed, John B., "Educating Illinois: Illinois State University, 1857-2007" (2009). Educating Illinois. 1. https://ir.library.illinoisstate.edu/eil/1.
 Freed, John, "The Founding of Illinois State Normal University: Normal School or State University?" Journal of the Illinois State Historical Society, 101 (Summer 2008), 106–26.
 Wyman, Marc, "The Fourteenth Decade: Illinois State University, 1987-1997" (1999). Illinois State University History Books. 6. https://ir.library.illinoisstate.edu/isuhistorybook/6
 Champagne, Roger J., "The Thirteenth Decade: Illinois State University, 1977-1987" (1989). Illinois State University History Books. 5. https://ir.library.illinoisstate.edu/isuhistorybook/5
 Champagne, Roger J., "A Place for Education" (1978). Illinois State University History Books. 1. https://ir.library.illinoisstate.edu/isuhistorybook/1
 Marshall, Helen E., "The Eleventh Decade" (1967). Illinois State University History Books. 3. https://ir.library.illinoisstate.edu/isuhistorybook/3
 Marshall, Helen E., "Grandest of Enterprises: Illinois State University, 1857-1957" (1956). Illinois State University History Books. 4. https://ir.library.illinoisstate.edu/isuhistorybook/4
 Harper, Charles A., "Development of the Teachers College in the United States with Special Reference to the Illinois State Normal University" (1935). Illinois State University History Books. 8. https://ir.library.illinoisstate.edu/isuhistorybook/8
 Felmley, David, "Semi-Centennial History of the Illinois State Normal University: 1857-1907" (1907). Illinois State University History Books. 7. https://ir.library.illinoisstate.edu/isuhistorybook/7
 Williston Cook, John and McHugh, James V., "A History of the Illinois State Normal University" (1882). Illinois State University History Books. 2. https://ir.library.illinoisstate.edu/isuhistorybook/2

External links

 
 Illinois State University Athletics website
 

 
State universities in Illinois
Public universities and colleges in Illinois
Bloomington–Normal
Educational institutions established in 1857
Universities and colleges in Bloomington–Normal
Education in McLean County, Illinois
Buildings and structures in McLean County, Illinois
Tourist attractions in Bloomington–Normal
1857 establishments in Illinois
Universities and colleges accredited by the Higher Learning Commission